Gooitske Marsman (born 7 April 1965) is a Dutch judoka. She competed in the women's lightweight event at the 1992 Summer Olympics.

References

External links
 

1965 births
Living people
Dutch female judoka
Olympic judoka of the Netherlands
Judoka at the 1992 Summer Olympics
People from Vlaardingen
Sportspeople from South Holland